Guayanilla is a town and municipality of Puerto Rico located on the southern coast of the island, bordering the Caribbean Sea, south of Adjuntas, east of Yauco; and west of Peñuelas and about  west of Ponce. Guayanilla is spread over 16 barrios and Guayanilla Pueblo (the downtown area and the administrative center of the city). It is part of the Yauco Metropolitan Statistical Area.

History

Guayanilla was founded by Puerto Rican criollos. The original name was Guadianilla in memory of a river and town of the same name in Spain. However, it was changed to Guayanilla to resemble a native word in the Taíno language. The name Guayanilla is derived from a combination of Guaynia and Santa Maria de Guadianilla.

The first Europeans settled in this area in 1511. In 1756, Yauco was founded as a town. Then Guayanilla was a borough of Yauco. Due to the very fertile lands and access to the local port where most of the local commerce occurred, Guayanilla became an important agricultural center where sugarcane was cultivated. Guayanilla grew quickly and was established as a separate municipality on February 27, 1833 by Governor Miguel de la Torre.

Puerto Rico was ceded by Spain in the aftermath of the Spanish–American War under the terms of the Treaty of Paris of 1898 and became a territory of the United States. In 1899, the United States Department of War conducted a census of Puerto Rico finding that the population of Guayanilla was 9,540.

On September 20, 2017 Hurricane Maria struck Puerto Rico.  In Guayanilla, the hurricane triggered numerous landslides and caused major destruction with an estimated 600 homes losing their roof and 300 homes completely destroyed. Roads, crops and structures were destroyed by the winds and flooding.

2019 - 2020 Earthquakes

On January 6, 2020 a 5.8 magnitude earthquake was felt in Guayanilla and several structures and cars were destroyed. A family of eight escaped a home that was destroyed by the earthquake.

On January 7, 2020 a 6.4 magnitude earthquake destroyed the Catholic church in Guayanilla Pueblo.

Geography
Guayanilla is located on the southern coast. The coastline forms the Guayanilla Bay, one of the best natural harbors in Puerto Rico, to the south, also. The northern regions are bordered by mountains that reach  at the Cordillera Central. In the central regions, the terrain descends where it does not exceed 1,410 feet (430 m). Finally in the coastal plain, the elevations do not exceed . The Yauco, Guayanilla, and Macaná rivers all run through the municipality. The Yauco River briefly runs through the Boca borough, where its exit into the Caribbean Sea and accompanying marshlands are located.

Barrios

Like all municipalities of Puerto Rico, Guayanilla is subdivided into barrios.

Barrero 
Boca 
Cedro 
Consejo 
Guayanilla barrio-pueblo 
Indios 
Jagua Pasto 
Jaguas 
Llano 
Macaná 
Magas 
Pasto 
Playa 
Quebrada Honda 
Quebradas 
Rufina 
Sierra Baja

Sectors
Barrios (which are like minor civil divisions) and subbarrios, in turn, are further subdivided into smaller local populated place areas/units called sectores (sectors in English). The types of sectores may vary, from normally sector to urbanización to reparto to barriada to residencial, among others.

Special Communities

 (Special Communities of Puerto Rico) are marginalized communities whose citizens are experiencing a certain amount of social exclusion. A map shows these communities occur in nearly every municipality of the commonwealth. Of the 742 places that were on the list in 2014, the following barrios, communities, sectors, or neighborhoods were in Guayanilla: Magas Abajo, Villa del Carmen in Playa barrio, Piedras Blancas, Playita, and San Pedro.

Tourism

There are 17 beaches in Guayanilla.
Places to visit: Mario Mercado Castle, Chorro de Oro Waterfall, El Convento Cave, Guilarte State Forest, Emajagua Beach, La Ventana Beach, Tamarindo Beach, Central Rufina Ruins. El Castillo del Niño (The Child's Castle) amusement park.
Festivals: Town Carnival (April), Student Festival (May), Beach Festival (May), Cross Festivities (May), Fishing Festival (June), Seafood Festival (June), Our Lady of Mount Carmel Festival (July), Ladies' Marathon (November), Immaculate Conception Festivities (December).

Economy

Industry
The main industries in Guayanilla are the manufacturing of petrochemicals and the production of electricity by thermoelectrical plants. Guayanilla produces over half of Puerto Rico's electricity. The breakdown of occupations are as follows:

22.2% : Educational, medical, and social services
14.5% : Public administration
14.5% : Construction
11.3% : Manufacturing
9.6% : Retail trade
6.4% : Transportation and warehousing, and utilities
5.3% : Arts, entertainment, recreation, accommodation, and food services
4.5% : Other services
3.6% : Professional, scientific, management, administrative, and waste management services
2.9% : Agriculture, forestry, fishing and hunting, and mining
2.3% : Finance, insurance, real estate, and rental and leasing
1.8% : Wholesale trade
1.2% : Information

Demographics

According to the Census in 2000, 99.2% Hispanic of any race. 65.5% white, 11.1% black, 19.3% mixed, 5.1% other. There were 7,209 households, out of which 40.9% had children under the age of 18 living with them, 57.3% were married couples living together, 21.7% had a female householder with no husband present, and 16.4% were non-families. 15.2% live alone, and 7.1% live alone and were over 65 years of age. The average household size was 3.19, and the average family size was 3.55.

The age distribution of the population was 30.0% under the age of 18, 11.8% from 18 to 24, 26.2% from 25 to 44, 21.2% from 45 to 64, and 10.8% over 65. The median age was 31 years.

The median income for a household was $11,361, and the median income for a family was $13,187. The per capita income for the city was $5,954. 57.0% of the population and 54.9% of the families were below the poverty line.

Culture

Festivals and events
Guayanilla celebrates its patron saint festival in December. The  is a religious and cultural celebration that generally features parades, games, artisans, amusement rides, regional food, and live entertainment.

Other festivals and events celebrated in Guayanilla include:

Youth Festival – May
Beach Festival – May
Cross Festival – May
Shore Fishing Festival and Triathlon – June
Virgen del Carmen Festival – June
Seafood Festival – June
Farazo Festival – July
Town Carnival – July
International Women's Marathon – November

Government

Like all municipalities in Puerto Rico, Guayanilla is administered by a mayor. The current mayor is Nelson Torres Yordán, from the Popular Democratic Party of Puerto Rico (PPD).

The city belongs to the Puerto Rico Senatorial district V, which is represented by two senators. In 2012, Ramón Ruiz and Martín Vargas Morales, from the Popular Democratic Party, were elected as district senators.

Symbols
The  has an official flag and coat of arms.

Flag
This municipality has a flag.

Coat of arms
This municipality has a coat of arms.

Education
The following schools are located in Guayanilla and students from both schools have participated in the Rose Parade in California on several occasions:
 Escuela Arístides Cales Quirós 
 Asunción Rodríguez de Sala

Transportation
There are 35 bridges in Guayanilla.

Nazario Collection
The Nazario Collection, a set of inscribed stones discovered by Catholic priest and amateur archeologist José M. Nazario (and which popular culture links to Taíno chief Agüeybaná II), has become a cultural symbol for the municipality. The statuettes serve as the center piece of Guayanilla's Father Nazario Museum of Lithic Epigraphy.

Gallery

See also

List of Puerto Ricans
History of Puerto Rico
Did you know-Puerto Rico?
Municipalities of Puerto Rico
Corsican immigration to Puerto Rico
Roanoke Colony

References

Further reading

External links 
 Guayanilla Municipality on Facebook
 Puerto Rico Government Guayanilla

Municipalities of Puerto Rico
Populated coastal places in Puerto Rico
Populated places established in 1833
Yauco metropolitan area
1833 establishments in the Spanish Empire